Chelis turkestana is a moth in the family Erebidae. It was described by Vladimir Viktorovitch Dubatolov in 1996. It is found in the Turkestan Range in Central Asia.

This species was moved from the genus Palearctia to Chelis as a result of phylogenetic research published in 2016.

References

Moths described in 1996
Arctiina